Detlef Fuhrmann (born 22 July 1953) is a German former athlete. He competed in the men's javelin throw at the 1980 Summer Olympics.

References

External links
 

1953 births
Living people
Athletes (track and field) at the 1980 Summer Olympics
German male javelin throwers
Olympic athletes of East Germany
People from Eisleben
Sportspeople from Saxony-Anhalt